Nathan Lee Gill (born 6 July 1973) is a British politician, who was the Leader of Reform UK Wales from March to May 2021, when he resigned from the party. He previously served as Member of the European Parliament (MEP) for Wales from 2014 to January 2020.

Gill served as a UK Independence Party (UKIP) MEP until his defection on 6 December 2018, and from 2016 to 2017 also an independent Member of the National Assembly for Wales.

Early life and career
Gill was born in England, but his family moved to Wales in the early 1980s. He was educated at Ysgol David Hughes and then Coleg Menai: on leaving the latter he joined a family-owned private company based in the East Riding of Yorkshire.

He founded and managed Burgill Ltd in March 2004, with his mother Elaine. Registered in Llangefni, Anglesey, but operating solely in Kingston upon Hull, the company provided domiciliary and home care services mainly to Hull City Council. The company employed 180 staff, chiefly from central Europe (mainly Poland) and the Philippines, to which they optionally provided chargeable "bunkhouse"-style accommodation. In a later interview with the Western Mail after his election, Gill commented:

The company collapsed into administration with debts of £116,000, after its main bankers HSBC withdrew its borrowing facility, owing to the financial crisis of 2007–2008.

Gill then moved back to Wales, where he now lives in Llangefni, Isle of Anglesey, with his American wife Jana, and five children. The family are practising members of the Church of Jesus Christ of Latter-day Saints.

Political career
In July 2012, he came last in the election of councillor for the Llanbedrgoch electoral division.

In May 2013, he led the UKIP group of candidates in the Anglesey local elections, which included his wife, Jana Gill (standing for Canolbarth Môn), and his sister, Jayne Gill (for Aethwy). Gill himself stood to be elected as councillor for the new electoral division of Seiriol, but he came in eighth place with 7% of the vote. The party did not win any seats on the island's council.

In August 2013, he came third behind Plaid Cymru's Rhun ap Iorwerth in the National Assembly for Wales by-election for Ynys Môn.

With John Bufton stepping down as MEP in 2014, Gill was selected as UKIP candidate number one for Wales in the European Parliament Election and held on to the seat for the party.

During the UKIP Wales Conference on 6 December 2014, Nigel Farage, then-Leader of UK Independence Party, announced that Gill would be the Leader of the Party in Wales. During the 2015 general election campaign, Gill represented UKIP in the ITV Welsh TV Leaders debate. During the election campaign, Gill denied human involvement in climate change, comments which were strongly criticised by other leaders.

In the 2016 Assembly election Gill won a seat representing the North Wales region. He was beaten to the post of leader of the UKIP group in the National Assembly for Wales by former Conservative MP Neil Hamilton. Farage described the move as an "unjust act of deep ingratitude"  resulting in Hamilton dismissing Farage as simply an "MEP for South East England whose opinions were irrelevant". Gill subsequently left the UKIP group in the assembly to sit as an independent, citing much infighting and distractions. He remained a member of the party and its leader in Wales, until Neil Hamilton was made Wales leader in September 2016. Also in September 2016 Gill's media advisor Alexandra Phillips spoke to The Guardian, stating that she had left UKIP and joined the Conservatives, making comments critical of Hamilton. Staying on as an advisor to Gill, she told BBC Wales that UKIP's foothold in Wales had become "a war zone". Gill resigned as an AM in December 2017.

On 6 December 2018, Gill resigned from UKIP, in opposition to the party leader Gerard Batten's links to far-right activist Tommy Robinson. He joined the new Brexit Party in February 2019.

He was re-elected as an MEP in Wales in the 2019 European Parliament election. He was elected alongside fellow Brexit Party candidate, James Wells.

Gill ran in Caerphilly in the 2019 general election, and came 4th with 11.2% of the vote.

On 26 March 2021, Gill was announced as Leader of Reform UK Wales. Gill was a regional list candidate in the 2021 Senedd election for the North Wales electoral region but failed to be elected. He quit Reform UK shortly afterwards.

In March 2023, Nation.Cymru revealed that Gill had met multiple meetings with pro-Russian leaders in Ukraine and Moldova that were organised by men accused of being Kremlin agents.

Personal life
Gill and his wife, Jana have five children.

References

External links
 Official website
 European Parliament - Profile
 Nathan Gill on Twitter
 Nathan Gill on Facebook
 Nathan Gill on LinkedIn

1973 births
Living people
English businesspeople
English Latter Day Saints
English libertarians
People from Anglesey
People educated at Ysgol David Hughes
20th-century Welsh businesspeople
21st-century Welsh businesspeople
Welsh Latter Day Saints
Welsh people of English descent
UK Independence Party MEPs
Brexit Party MEPs
Reform UK parliamentary candidates
MEPs for Wales 2014–2019
MEPs for Wales 2019–2020
UK Independence Party members of the Senedd
Wales MSs 2016–2021
Welsh libertarians